= /r/ sound =

/r/ sound may refer to:

- the IPA notation for a dental, alveolar and postalveolar trill.
- a rhotic consonant more generally.
